Jay Jays is an Australian apparel chain store that was founded in 1993, and is owned and operated by the Just Group. The chain has over 200 stores located in Australia and New Zealand.

Jay Jays focuses on clothing for younger people.

History
Jay Jays is an Australian apparel chain store that was founded in 1993, after acquisition and repositioning of the iconic Jay Jays Warehouse. The company is owned and operated by the Just Group. The chain has stores in Australia and New Zealand.

References

External links
 

Clothing retailers of Australia
Clothing retailers of New Zealand
Clothing companies established in 1993
Retail companies established in 1993
1993 establishments in Australia